Michael Hare may refer to:

 Michael Hare (architect)
 Michael Hare, 2nd Viscount Blakenham